Harold Boggess (May 16, 1908 – May 21, 1993), who used the stage name John Holland, was an American actor and singer.

Biography
John Holland was born in Fremont, Nebraska. He adopted his grandfather's name John Holland as a stage name. He began acting in Hollywood films in 1937, and later appeared on numerous television series, including Hawaiian Eye, Wagon Train, and Perry Mason. His most notable film credits were My Fair Lady (1964), How to Succeed in Business Without Really Trying (1967), and Chinatown (1974).

In addition to film and television, Holland acted in musical theater, such as the Broadway production of Peter Pan (1954), and in plays, such as the touring company of The Caine Mutiny Court-Martial. He received positive reviews for his performance in a concert titled "The California Night of Music" in Los Angeles in September 1937. He often gave free concerts during visits to his parents in Alton, Illinois, accompanied by his father, organist Newton Boggess.

John Holland died on May 21, 1993 in Woodland Hills, Los Angeles, five days past his 85th birthday.

Selected filmography

Film

 Larceny on the Air (1937) - Druggist (uncredited)
 Join the Marines (1937) - Lieutenant
 Dick Tracy (1937) - Anderson's Secretary (uncredited)
 Paradise Express (1937) - Gus
 Circus Girl (1937) - Reporter
 Balalaika (1939) - (uncredited)
 Up in the Air (1940) - Quigley
 Phantom of Chinatown (1940) - Mason
 The Green Hornet Strikes Again! (1940) - Grinson - Foreign Agent [Ch. 2] (uncredited)
 Pot o' Gold (1941) - Sponsor (uncredited)
 Sky Raiders (1941) - Hess - Henchman
 Pals of the Pecos (1941) - Jim Buckley
 Roar of the Press (1941) - Robert Mallon
 Adventure in Washington (1941) - Desk Clerk (uncredited)
 Our Wife (1941) - Steward (uncredited)
 Gentleman from Dixie (1941) - Brawley
 Dangerous Lady (1941) - Guy Kisling
 Uncle Joe (1941) - Paul Darcey
 Don Winslow of the Navy (1942) - Paul Barsac
 Mr. and Mrs. North (1942) - Party Guest (uncredited)
 Yokel Boy (1942) - Rod La Tour (uncredited)
 House of Errors (1942) - Paul Gordon
 We Were Dancing (1942) - Hubert's Friend (uncredited)
 Take a Letter, Darling (1942) - Secretary
 She's in the Army (1942) - Wally Lundigan - Columnist
 Submarine Raider (1942) - Bryan (uncredited)
 Eagle Squadron (1942) - Fire Warden (uncredited)
 Beyond the Blue Horizon (1942) - Herrick (uncredited)
 Flight Lieutenant (1942) - Officer (uncredited)
 Invisible Agent (1942) - Spencer's Secretary (uncredited)
 Call of the Canyon (1942) - Willy Hitchcock
 The Palm Beach Story (1942) - Member of Wedding Party (uncredited)
 Lucky Legs (1942) - Fur Salesman (uncredited)
 Big Town After Dark (1947) - District Attorney Harding (uncredited)
 The Voice of the Turtle (1947) - Henry Atherton
 King of the Gamblers (1948) - Symonds
 Romance on the High Seas (1948) - Best Man (uncredited)
 Blonde Ice (1948) - Carl Hanneman
 Sons of Adventure (1948) - Paul Kenyon
 Behind Locked Doors (1948) - Dr. J.R. Bell (uncredited)
 The Three Musketeers (1948) - Aramis' Friend (uncredited)
 My Dear Secretary (1948) - Mr. Hudson (uncredited)
 State Department: File 649 (1949) - Ballinger
 Tulsa (1949) - Reporter (uncredited)
 Law of the Golden West (1949) - Quentin Morell
 Massacre River (1949) - Roberts
 Rock Island Trail (1950) - Major Porter
 Second Chance (1950) - Dr. Matthews
 Rio Grande Patrol (1950) - Fowler
 Belle Le Grand (1951) - John's Friend (uncredited)
 Man of Conflict (1953) - Doctor
 Jubilee Trail (1954) - Mr. Drake (uncredited)
 King Richard and the Crusaders (1954) - Castelaine Man-at-Arms (uncredited)
 Street of Sinners (1957) - Harry
 The Girl in Black Stockings (1957) - Norman Grant
 A Lust to Kill (1958) - Mayor Jonathan W. McKenzie
 Tales of Wells Fargo (1959 episode "Lola Montez") - Chris Hurley
 Bells Are Ringing (1960) - Party Guest (uncredited)
 Ocean's 11 (1960) - Minor Role (scenes deleted)
 The High Powered Rifle (1960) - District Attorney
 The Little Shepherd of Kingdom Come (1961) - (uncredited)
 Moon Pilot (1962) - Joe McCord (uncredited)
 The Couch (1962) - Vendor (uncredited)
 Air Patrol (1962) - Arthur Murcott
 Police Nurse (1963) - Edward Mayhall
 A Gathering of Eagles (1963) - Lord Beresford, S.A.C. Observer
 The Madmen of Mandoras (1963) - Prof. John Coleman
 The Prize (1963) - Awards Ceremony Speaker (uncredited)
 Open the Door and See All the People (1964) - Antoine
 My Fair Lady (1964) - Butler
 My Blood Runs Cold (1965) - Mr. Courtland
 The Naked Brigade (1965) - Maj. Hamilton
 The Oscar (1966) - Stevens
 How to Succeed in Business Without Really Trying (1967) - Matthews
 Topaz (1969) - State Department Official #2 (uncredited)
 1776 (1972) - William Whipple (NH) (uncredited)
 Lost in the Stars (1974) - Van Jarsdale
 Chinatown (1974) - Farmer in the Valley #1
 The Strongest Man in the World (1975) - Regent (uncredited)
 From Noon Till Three (1976) - Song Publisher (uncredited)
 Joni (1979) - Del Vecchio
 Fear No Evil (1981) - Rafael / Father Damon

Television

 The Honeymooners (1955) - Tony Amico
 Make Room for Daddy (1957)
 Death Valley Days (1957-1960) - Bellingham / Duke Jordan / James Anders
 Perry Mason (1957-1966) - Bruno Grant / Leonard Voss / Clinton Forbes / Carver Clement / Phillip Walsh
 Have Gun – Will Travel (1959-1962) - the Colonel / Cortwright
 Wagon Train (1959-1965) - Prof. Sheffield / Mr. Rollins / Ellington
 The Third Man (1959-1963) - Walter Strickland / Paul Price
 Tombstone Territory (1960)
 Maverick (1960) - Farnsworth McCoy / Terence Tamblyn / Tall Man
 Hawaiian Eye (1961-1962) - Christopher / Harvey Hawley / Mr. Kendall
 Adam's Rib (1973) - Judge McElroy
 Battlestar Galactica (1978-1979) - Waiter
 Crossings (1986) - Captain St. John (final television appearance)

References

External links

1908 births
1993 deaths
American baritones
American male musical theatre actors
Male actors from Nebraska
People from Fremont, Nebraska
20th-century American singers
20th-century American male singers